Vital do Rêgo Filho (born September 21, 1963) is a Brazilian politician and doctor. He represented Paraíba in the Federal Senate from 2011 to 2014. Previously, he was a Deputy from Paraíba from 2007 to 2011. He was a member of the Brazilian Democratic Movement Party. Assumed office in the Federal Court of Accounts on December 22, 2014, appointed by president Dilma Rousseff. In the Senate, senator Raimundo Lira took office in his place.

Operation Car Wash
On May 19, 2016, minister Teori Zavascki ordered the opening of inquiry that investigates Vital do Rêgo Filho in Operation Car Wash for supposed payoff charges from contractors when, in office as senator, led the Parliamentary Committee of Inquiry of Petrobras in the Congress.

References

Living people
1963 births
People from Campina Grande
Brazilian Democratic Movement politicians
Brazilian Socialist Party politicians
Democratic Labour Party (Brazil) politicians
Government ministers of Brazil
Members of the Chamber of Deputies (Brazil) from Paraíba
Members of the Legislative Assembly of Paraíba
Members of the Federal Senate (Brazil)